Bezange-la-Petite is a commune in the Moselle department in Grand Est in northeastern France.

Population

See also
Communes of the Moselle department

References

External links

 

Communes of Moselle (department)